Kom Ombo (Egyptian Arabic: ; Coptic:   or  ; Ancient Greek:    or  ; or Latin:  and  is an agricultural town in Egypt famous for the Temple of Kom Ombo. It was originally an Egyptian city called Nubt, meaning City of Gold (not to be confused with the city north of Naqada that was also called Nubt/Ombos). It became a Greek settlement during the Greco-Roman Period.

History

Ombos was a garrison town under every dynasty of Egypt as well as the Ptolemaic Kingdom and Roman Egypt, and was celebrated for the magnificence of its temples and its hereditary feud with the people of Dendera.

Ombos was the first city below Aswan at which any remarkable remains of antiquity occur. The Nile, indeed, at this portion of its course, was ill-suited to a dense population in antiquity. It runs between steep and narrow banks of sandstone, and deposits but little of its fertilizing slime upon the dreary and barren shores. There are two temples at Ombos, constructed of the stone obtained from the neighboring quarries of Hagar Silsilah.

The more magnificent of two stands upon the top of a sandy hill, and appears to have been a species of Pantheon, since, according to extant inscriptions, it was dedicated to Haroeris and the other deities of the Ombite nome by the soldiers quartered there. The smaller temple to the northwest was sacred to the goddess Isis. Both, indeed, are of an imposing architecture, and still retain the brilliant colors with which their builders adorned them. However, they are from the Ptolemaic Kingdom, with the exception of a doorway of sandstone, built into a wall of brick. This was part of a temple built by Thutmose III in honor of the crocodile-headed god Sobek. The monarch is represented on tress, the doorjambs, holding the measuring reed and chisel, the emblems of construction, and in the act of dedicating the temple.

The Ptolemaic portions of the larger temple present an exception to an almost universal rule in Egyptian architecture. It has no propylon or dromos in front of it, and the portico has an uneven number of columns, in all fifteen, arranged in a triple row. Of these columns, thirteen are still erect. As there are two principal entrances, the temple would seem to be two united in one, strengthening the supposition that it was the Pantheon of the Ombite nome. On a cornice above the doorway of one of the adyta, there is a Greek inscription, recording the erection, or perhaps the restoration of the sekos by Ptolemy VI Philometor and his sister-wife Cleopatra II, 180-145 BCE. The hill on which the Ombite temples stand has been considerably excavated at its base by the river, which here strongly inclines to the Arabian bank.

The crocodile was held in especial honor by the people of Ombos; and in the adjacent catacombs are occasionally found mummies of the sacred animal. Juvenal, in his 15th satire, has given a lively description of a fight, of which he was an eye-witness, between the Ombitae and the inhabitants of Dendera, who were hunters of the crocodile. On this occasion the men of Ombos had the worst of it; and one of their number, having stumbled in his flight, was caught and eaten by the Denderites. The Roman coins of the Ombite nome exhibit the crocodile and the effigy of the crocodile-headed god Sobek.

In Kom Ombo there is a rare engraved image of what is thought to be the first representation of medical instruments for performing surgery, including scalpels, curettes, forceps, dilator, scissors and medicine bottles dating from the days of Roman Egypt.

At this site there is another Nilometer used to measure the level of the river waters. On the opposite side of the Nile was a suburb of Ombos, called Contra-Ombos.

The city was the seat of a bishop during Late Antiquity. Two bishops of Omboi are known by name, Silbanos (before 402) and Verses (402). Under the name Ombi, it is included in the Catholic Church's list of titular sees. Karol Wojtyła (the future Pope John Paul II) was titular bishop of Ombi from 1958 until 1963, when he was appointed Archbishop of Kraków.

Geography

Climate 
The Köppen climate classification classifies its climate as hot desert (BWh).

Today
Today, irrigated sugarcane and cereal account for most of the agricultural industry.

Most of the 60,000 villagers are native Egyptians, although there is a large population of Nubians, including many Magyarabs who were displaced from their land upon the creation of Lake Nasser.

In 2010, plans to construct a new $700m  solar power plant near the city were unveiled by the Egyptian government.

Gallery

See also
 List of cities and towns in Egypt

References

External links

 Kom Ombo Temple

 
Cities in ancient Egypt
Populated places in Aswan Governorate
Ombi
Roman sites in Egypt